Discover Pakistan TV is a Pakistani television channel based in Lahore, Pakistan.

Discover Pakistan TV channel broadcasts documentaries, infotainment programs, coverage of tourism events, and development within Pakistan.

History
Discover Pakistan is a tourism-focused satellite TV channel launched on 21 March 2021. It is owned by Options International SMC. It is licensed by the Pakistan Electronic Media Regulatory Authority.

The channel has also worked with Government of Punjab, Pakistan's Tourism Development Corporation of Punjab.

See also
List of Television Stations in Pakistan
List of news channels in Pakistan

References

External links
Discover Pakistan TV - official website

Television stations in Lahore
Television stations in Pakistan